Five ships and one shore establishment of the Royal Navy have borne the name HMS Dauntless:

  was an 18-gun sloop launched at Hull, England in November 1804. In 1807 she ran aground during a battle in the Vistula River and was forced to surrender to the French.
  was a 26-gun sloop launched in 1808 and sold for breaking in 1825.
  was a 24-gun (from 1854, 33-gun) frigate launched in 1847 and sold for breaking in 1885.
  was a  light cruiser launched in 1918. She was used as a training vessel from 1943 before being sold for breaking in 1946.
 HMS Dauntless was the WRNS training establishment at Burghfield, near Reading, Berkshire, from 1947 until 1981.
  is a Type 45 destroyer launched on 23 January 2007 at the BAE Systems Govan shipyard in Glasgow, and commissioned in June 2010.

Battle honours
Ships named Dauntless have earned the following battle honours:
Baltic, 1854
Crimea, 1854–55
Atlantic, 1939

In popular culture
 In the 2003 film Pirates of the Caribbean: The Curse of the Black Pearl, a fictional HMS Dauntless appears as the flagship and pride of the Royal Navy.

References
 

Royal Navy ship names